Culleoka is an unincorporated community in the southeastern corner of Maury County, Tennessee, located southeast of Columbia. The population was 4,964 in 2010 and in 2016 the estimated population was 5,078.

Culleoka was established in 1857 in anticipation of the construction of the Nashville and Decatur Railroad, which reached the site in 1859. Culleoka was the original site of Webb School, which is now located in the historic town of Bell Buckle.

Demographics

Culleoka's population is 94.6% white, 2.6% African-American, and 1.2% Latino. Being the largest demographic groups in the community.

Politics
The Culleoka area has voted consistently Republican since the 2004 United States presidential election.

Religion statistics for Culleoka (based on Maury County data) 
 Evangelical Protestant 30.4%
 Mainline Protestant 7.2%
 Black Protestant 4.8%
 Catholic 22.5%
 Other 2.4%
 None 52.6%

References

External links

Unincorporated communities in Maury County, Tennessee
Unincorporated communities in Tennessee
1857 establishments in Tennessee